Sheffield United Football Club participated in League One, the third level of English football, during the 2013–14 season, after losing in the previous season's play-off semi final.  The club appointed a new manager, former Scotland international David Weir, saw a new co-owner arrive in the form of Prince Abdullah bin Musa'ed bin Abdulaziz Al Saud and signed an influx of new players during the summer transfer window.  Despite this the team saw a very poor start to the season, winning only one of their opening thirteen fixtures. This run of results saw David Weir depart the club to be replaced by former England International and former Derby County manager Nigel Clough. Despite beginning to improve performances on the pitch, United remained in relegation trouble into January, but then embarked on a lengthy run of form that would eventually see them finish in seventh in the table. Having been knocked out in the early rounds of both the League Cup and League Trophy, United enjoyed a lengthy run in the FA Cup, eventually reaching the competitions semi-final where they were narrowly beaten by Hull City.

Background

United had spent the previous season challenging for promotion from League One under manager Danny Wilson.  Despite spending much of the season in the automatic promotion positions, the team's home form was poor, winning only nine games all season.  With results declining, United sacked manager Wilson in April, replacing him with coach Chris Morgan but this wasn't enough to change their fortunes and the side finished the season fifth.  United met Yeovil Town in the play-offs semi-final but lost 2–1 on aggregate and were consigned to spend a third consecutive season in League One.

Kit and sponsors
At the end of July, United unveiled new home and away kits for the following season. Produced by Macron, the home kit maintained the clubs traditional red and white stripes, albeit with the addition of a solid red panel across the shoulders and neck.  The away kit was a complete change from previous seasons, consisting of an all yellow shirt with green trim plus green socks and shorts. The club also announced that the home kit would be sponsored by Spanish video game developer VSports, and the away kit would bear the logo of Chinese real estate company Top Spring. The following day the club also announced a new secondary shirt sponsor, with the logo for video game Football Manager appearing on the back of both the home and away shirts for the following season. In September United announced a secondary sponsor, with mobile phone distributor Shebang's logo appearing on the shorts of both the home and away kit.

Season overview

The hunt for a new manager
Sheffield United started the close season without a permanent manager, with caretaker manager Chris Morgan looking after the position whilst a fixed term manager was appointed. Morgan had admitted that he wanted the job permanently, but the club opted to invite applications from experienced candidates. Meanwhile, the club restructured the football club board, with former chief executive Julian Winter returning to the role only a year after quitting the position. The process to find a new manager proved to be a lengthy one with many managers and coaches being linked to the vacant position including interim manager Chris Morgan, Paul Dickov Rob Page, Gareth Southgate, Russell Slade, Michael Appleton, Kenny Jackett, and Keith Curle. Graham Arnold of Central Coast Mariners, Stuart McCall of Motherwell and Karl Robinson of MK Dons all rejected approaches from Sheffield United. By the start of June Everton reserve team coach David Weir emerged as the clear favourite for the job, and was duly appointed on 10 June, signing a three-year deal.

Preseason

Unlike the previous three years, Sheffield United opted not to undertake a pre-season tour of Malta; instead preferring a short trip to Scotland for three matches, before returning to England for a trio of friendlies against League Two sides. At the start of June Barry Robson agreed a deal with Scottish Premier League club Aberdeen, signalling his departure from Bramall Lane. Later that week youth Team coach and former assistant manager, David Unsworth, was given permission by United to speak with Kilmarnock about their vacant managerial position, but rejected the approach. With Barry Robson having already left the club, United subsequently announced their retained list, and signalled the departure of Danny Coyne, Matthew Harriott, Lecsinel Jean-François and Dave Kitson. However they also indicated that Aaron Barry, Jordan Chapell, Danny Higginbotham, Jordan Hodder, Terry Kennedy, Callum McFadzean, Jahmal Smith and Elliott Whitehouse had all taken the option to have their contracts extended. Manager David Weir began to pull together his back-room team by appointing former Rangers fitness coach Adam Owen to the position of "Assistant Manager – Performance" on 21 June. A few days later United unveiled their first signings of the close season; Stephen McGinn from Watford, Sean McGinty from Manchester United and Febian Brandy from Walsall all on two-year deals; whilst Jasper Johns was signed from Everton signed a one-year deal.

At the start of July Weir added to his backroom staff by appointing former Everton team mate Lee Carsley to the position of "Assistant Manager – Technical". United opened their tour of Scotland with a 1–0 win over Greenock Morton thanks to a goal from Chris Porter, before a second Porter goal in as many games helped United to a 1–1 draw with Cowdenbeath a few days later. Despite the club having only recently extended his contract, Jordan Chapell was joined Torquay United on a free transfer on 9 July, agreeing a 2-year deal with the south coast club. United then completed their Scotland tour with a 2–1 victory over Raith Rovers. Returning south of the border, United next faced and away trip to Bury where they had to come from behind to register a 3–1 victory at Gigg Lane. The following week Richard Cresswell was allowed to leave on a free transfer, signing a one-year deal with York City, followed by United signing Falkirk striker Lyle Taylor for an undisclosed fee. Taylor made his first appearance for United in a friendly at Mansfield Town the following weekend, helping the Blades to a 1–0 victory thanks to a goal from Fabien Brandy. On 22 July United continued to revamp their squad by signing Conor Coady on a six-month loan from Liverpool, before a strong United side headed to Alfreton Town the same evening, registering a 1–0 victory. United completed their pre-season fixture list with two games in quick succession, holding Greek Superleague side Atromitos to a 2–2 draw at Bramall Lane on 26 July, and then registering a 1–1 draw with York City less than 24 hours later. With the pre-season schedule completed David Weir confirmed that Michael Doyle would remain as Captain for the upcoming season.

August and September: The Prince of Bramall Lane
 

On the eve of the new season, coach and former assistant manager David Unsworth left the club, and later the same day Irish youngster Aaron Barry was allowed to join Scottish Championship club Dumbarton on loan until the end of January to gain first team experience. In celebration of The Football League's 125 anniversary, United featured in a televised opening fixture against Notts County in recognition of County being the oldest league club in the world, while Bramall Lane is the oldest football ground in the world. With Febian Brandy, Conor Coady, Stephen McGinn and Lyle Taylor all making their débuts, United triumphed 2–1 in the midst of a thunderstorm. In the next match United were knocked out in the first round of the League Cup by Burton Albion almost a year ago to the day to exactly the same fixture and outcome to the previous season. On 8 August George Long was called up to the England U21 team for a friendly match against Scotland U21s, and on the same day, Erik Tønne was recalled from his loan at HamKam so that he could sign for Sandnes Ulf on a permanent basis, ending his career with United. United's preparations for their next league game, away to Brentford were disrupted when Wolverhampton Wanderers had a bid accepted for midfielder Kevin McDonald, having triggered a release clause in his contract. United lost the subsequent fixture 3–1, and after lengthy negotiations, McDonald finally departed for an undisclosed fee on 14 August. The following day, Jamie McDonagh fractured his leg in two places whilst on international duty for Northern Ireland U19s, requiring acute surgery. Back in the league United were held to a 1–1 draw by Colchester United at Bramall Lane, followed by a 2–0 reverse at Bradford City. On 29 August Danny Higginbotham joined Chester after falling out of United's first team reckoning, while later the same day Jose Baxter joined from Oldham Athletic for an undisclosed fee on a three-year deal. Baxter made his United debut two days later but was unable to halt the club's poor form as they lost 1–0 to Milton Keynes Dons.

On the final day of the transfer window, United brought in young Belgian midfielder Florent Cuvelier from Stoke City on a three-year deal for an undisclosed fee and centre-forward Harry Bunn on a one-month loan deal from Manchester City. The following day the club announced that Saudi Prince Abdullah bin Mosaad Al Saud, of the royal House of Saud and former President of Al-Hilal FC, had bought a 50% stake in United's parent company 'Blades Leisure Ltd' for the fee of £1 with the promise of providing "substantial new capital" with the aim of returning the Blades to the Premier League as "quickly as possible". The same evening, United reached the second round of the Football League Trophy, despite failing to score for the third game in succession, winning a penalty shoot out over Scunthorpe United after the game had finished 0–0. Back in league action United were again the losing side as they were beaten 3–1 by near neighbours Rotherham United. Later that week, youngster Elliott Whitehouse was allowed to join York City on a month's loan to gain first team experience, before United's poor form continued as they slipped to a 1–0 defeat away at Carlisle United. With the side still struggling to score goals, United reached an agreement to bring in free agent Marlon King until the end of the season, quickly followed by winger Ryan Hall, who joined the Blades on a one-month loan from Leeds United. King and Hall both made their United debuts in the following game, a home fixture against Preston North End, but the Blades poor form continued as they fell to a 1–0 loss, their fifth consecutive defeat in the league and Preston's first victory at Bramall Lane since 1978. United ended the month with another defeat, this time a 2–0 away loss to Wolves.

October and November: Weir Out, Clough In
 
 
October began with the arrival of defender Simon Lappin who signed on a 28-day loan from Cardiff City on 4 October, while Chris Porter was allowed to leave in a similar deal for a spell with Chesterfield, and young striker Harry Bunn extended his own loan spell with the Blades for a further month. Lappin made his debut that same night as United scored their first goal in nearly seven hours of football, when Marlon King netted to earn a 1–1 home draw with Crawley Town. Another loss followed, this time to League Two Hartlepool United in the Football League Trophy, a match during which David Weir was barracked by the home support. This was to prove Weir's last game in charge as he was sacked three days later. With the club's Under-21s coach Chris Morgan in temporary charge once more, United dropped to the bottom of the League One table as they were defeated 3–2 by Coventry City. With United still to appoint a permanent successor to David Weir, Mick Wadsworth was appointed as first team coach on a temporary basis to support Chris Morgan, and the pair guided United to only their second win of the season as they beat Port Vale 2–1 at Bramall Lane. Ryan Hall returned to Leeds United, only to be immediately suspended by his parent club for a breach of discipline, while Morgan and Wadsworth remained in charge as United held Peterborough United to a mid-week 0–0 draw at their London Road Stadium. This was to prove Morgan's last game in charge of the Blades as former Derby County manager Nigel Clough was appointed as David Weir's permanent successor on 23 October 2013. Clough's tenure got off to a winning start as his new charges comfortably beat Crewe Alexandra 3–1 at Bramall Lane, before Clough made his first signing for the Blades a few days later, with Leeds United defender Aidan White joining on loan until New Year's Day.

Clough's second game in charge proved less satisfactory, with Febian Brandy being sent off only twelve minutes after coming on as a substitute and United slumping to a 2–0 defeat at Shrewsbury Town on 2 November. With his loan spell due to expire, United agreed a further deal to keep Simon Lappin at the club until January. The first round of the FA Cup saw the Blades progressed after a 3–2 victory over Colchester United, before Joe Ironside was allowed to join Halifax Town on loan until 5 January. Back in league action United suffered another home defeat, this time at the hands of Gillingham who ran out 2–1 winners. Callum McFadzean was allowed to join Chesterfield on loan until 3 January, before United registered their first away win since March, defeating fellow strugglers Bristol City 1–0 thanks to an own goal. United's followed this up with a 1–1 draw in a midweek home fixture against Walsall. With the loan window about to close Darryl Westlake was loaned to Mansfield Town, Marcus Williams joined Scunthorpe United, and Harry Bunn returned to Manchester City. United rounded off November with a 1–1 draw at Leyton Orient thanks to Conor Coady's first goal in senior football.

December and January: Cup progress
 
December started with the Blades progressing to the third round of the FA Cup with a 2–0 away win over Cambridge United thanks to goals from Jose Baxter and Jamie Murphy. With the academy leagues entering their winter breaks, United allowed a number of their academy prospects to undertake loans to local non-league sides over the Christmas period. In their next match, United recorded a 1–0 home victory against Swindon Town with Jose Baxter scoring his second goal in as many games. The club then announced further restructuring off the field, with Julian Winter leaving his position as chief executive, before being held to a draw on the field, in an away encounter with Stevenage. United entertained Oldham Athletic on Boxing Day and had to come from behind to register a 1–1 draw, before finishing the year with a 3–1 home victory over Tranmere Rovers.

 With the winter transfer window due to open, United opted to allow striker Lyle Taylor to join Scottish Premiership side Partick Thistle for the remainder of the season. Taylor was quickly followed by fellow striker Marlon King whose short-term contract was terminated at the end of the year. Youngster Jahmal Smith joined Harrogate Town on a youth loan. Having picked up an injury during the game against Oldham, Aidan White cut short his loan spell to return to Leeds for treatment. United's unbeaten run did not last into the new year, as despite leading 1–0 at half time, they were beaten 2–1 away at Walsall. As January began Aaron Barry returned from a successful loan spell at Dumbarton having played over 20 times for the Sons, before United knocked Premiership side Aston Villa out of the FA Cup following a 2–1 third round at Villa Park. The following week saw a flurry of arrivals and departures as Elliott Whitehouse returned from his loan spell at York City, whilst Joe Ironside returned from Halifax Town, Callum McFadzean returned from Chesterfield and youngster Jahmal Smith joined Harrogate Town on a months loan. Conor Coady then extended his loan with United until the end of February, and Darryl Westlake extended his loan with Mansfield Town until the end of the season. The following day Malachy Brannigan was unveiled as the club's new managing director, reuniting with Nigel Clough, with whom he had worked at Derby County. The week concluded with United signing Billy Paynter on loan for the rest of the season from South Yorkshire rivals Doncaster Rovers, whilst Marcus Williams left permanently for Scunthorpe United on a free transfer, and Sean McGinty joined Northampton Town on a months loan. For the second league fixture in a row United let a lead slip to lose 2–1 at Notts County, and then as Nigel Clough continued to revamp the squad, Febian Brandy was allowed to rejoin Walsall on loan for the remainder of the season, only six months after leaving the West Midlands club, and Florent Cuvelier joined Port Vale for a similar period. In their next match, United drew 2–2 at home with Yorkshire rivals Bradford City despite having held a two-goal lead at half time. 24 January saw United make a number of signings, bringing in John Brayford on loan for the remainder of the season from Cardiff City, signing Stefan Scougall from Livingston for an undisclosed fee, and agreeing a loan-swap deal with Blackpool that saw Bob Harris sign for a month with United, with Tony McMahon moving in the opposite direction. In the fifth round of the FA Cup United held Premier League Fulham to a 1–1 draw at Bramall Lane, despite being reduced to ten men for most of the second half following Michael Doyle's red card. On 30 January, McMahon agreed a permanent switch to Blackpool, after the west-coast club decided to take up the remainder of his contract. The following day, in the final hours of the transfer window, United agreed a similar deal with Bob Harris, taking over the remainder of his contract from his former club.

February and March: Climbing the table
 
With their scheduled mid-week league fixture called off due to a waterlogged pitch, the Blades next game was an away trip to Crewe Alexandra, where United's poor away form continued with a 3–0 defeat. United claimed another Premier League scalp in the FA Cup, thanks to a goal from Shaun Miller in the final minute of extra time, as the Blades recorded a 1–0 away victory over Fulham in their fourth round replay. Later that week Sean McGinty returned from his loan at Northampton Town, and Aaron Barry was allowed to leave United, and signed a permanent deal with Derry City in Northern Ireland. The following weekend saw United record a 2–0 home victory over fellow relegation strugglers Shrewsbury Town, marking their first league victory of the calendar year, with new signing Stefan Scougall scoring his first goal for the club. With the loan window re-opening, Joe Ironside joined Harrogate Town on a months loan, ahead of United's fifth-round FA Cup tie against Nottingham Forest, which saw them progress to the quarter finals after a 3–1 home victory thanks to two goals in two minutes from late substitute Chris Porter. Nigel Clough continued to reshape his squad the following week by bringing in midfielder Ben Davies on loan from his former club Derby County on 19 February, with Davies agreeing to spend the remainder of the season at Bramall Lane. United finally began to climb the table, moving out of the relegation places, as they recorded back-to-back league wins, beating Gillingham 1–0 away from home, and then registering a comfortable 3–0 victory over Bristol City at Bramall Lane on 22 February. Academy product Jordan Hodder joined Buxton on a one-month youth loan to get some first team experience, and on 25 February Conor Coady had his loan deal extended until the end of the season. Later that evening, the Blades registered a 1–0 away victory over Colchester United, thanks to a late penalty from substitute Chris Porter.
 
March started in a similar fashion, with a 1–0 away win at MK Dons with Stefan Scougall scoring the only goal. This was followed by a 2–0 home victory over Peterborough United on 4 March with goals from Porter and Davies, his first for the club. Later that week, with a number of the squad having picked up injuries and a busy fixture list ahead, Kieron Freeman joined United on a one-month loan from Derby County to act as defensive cover, before Nigel Clough was named as the League One 'Manager of the Month' the following day. Returning to FA Cup action, United booked their place in the semi-finals at Wembley Stadium after they beat Charlton Athletic 2–0 at Bramall Lane on 9 March. United played their third home game in a row three days later, and a 1–0 scoreline was enough to condemn Carlisle United to a league defeat, meaning the Blades had registered their tenth straight win in all competitions. United's winning run was halted in the next match however, as they were held to a goalless draw away at Preston North End. On 21 March Callum McFadzean joined Burton Albion on a one-month loan, while striker Shaun Miller joined Shrewsbury Town a day later, agreeing a loan until the end of the season. United's next league fixture was a gala fixture as the club celebrated 125 years since its formation, although the party was soured as Wolverhampton Wanderers inflicted the club's first defeat in eleven matches, winning 2–0 at Bramall Lane. After Elliott Whitehouse was allowed to join Alfreton Town on loan, United returned to winning ways with a 2–0 away victory over Crawley Town thanks to two goals from Conor Coady. On the deadline for loan deals, Sean McGinty joined Rochdale for the remainder of the season. March's final fixture saw United lose at Swindon Town, with a late goal condemning them to a 2–1 defeat.

April and May: Wembley yet again but no promotion

April started in controversial fashion as United played out a 0–0 draw with Brentford, as the referee initially sent off loanee Kieron Freeman and gave a penalty for a challenge in the area, only to rescind both decisions a few minutes later after consulting with the referee's assistant. United's next game also ended in a draw as they were held 1–1 at Bramall Lane by Leyton Orient, and with Kieron Freeman's loan deal due to expire, it was extended until the end of the season. With a visit to Wembley Stadium on the horizon, Blades were 1–0 victors in the South Yorkshire derby against Rotherham United at Bramall Lane on 8 April, despite fielding a largely reserve side, with Ben Davies converting a 90th-minute penalty. United's next fixture was an FA Cup semi-final appearance against Hull City where over 71,000 fans saw United twice take the lead in the first-half, only for them to get pegged back after the break and eventually lose 5–3 to their Premiership rivals. Back in league action, United then recorded a narrow home victory over bottom places Stevenage, with a single own goal being the difference between the sides. United's next game was an away fixture at Tranmere Rovers where the sides shared the points in a 0–0 draw, followed later the same week with a 2–1 away victory as United came from behind to beat Port Vale. With the season drawing to a close Harry Maguire was named in the PFA League One Team of the Season, before United registered a 1–1 away draw at Oldham Athletic on 29 April. As the club began to plan for the new season, Ryan Flynn agreed an extended deal, before the Blades rounded off the season with a 2–1 victory over Coventry City at Bramall Lane to end the season seventh in the table. Later in May, manager Nigel Clough was named FA Cup Manager of the Season by the League Managers Association in recognition of United's run to the semi-finals of the FA Cup.

Squad

Out on loan

Left before the end of the season

Transfers and contracts

In

Summer

Winter

Loan in

Out

Summer

Winter

Loan out

Contracts
New contracts and contract extensions.

League table

Season firsts

Player début
Players making their first team Sheffield United début in a fully competitive match.

Début goal

Players scoring their first goal for Sheffield United in a competitive fixture.

Stadia
First ever visit to a stadium for a competitive fixture

Squad statistics

Appearances and goals

|-
|colspan="16"|Players who left before the end of the season:

|}

Top scorers

United also benefited from three own goals, one in the Football League and one in the FA Cup.

Clean sheets

Penalties

Disciplinary record

International Call-ups

Matches

Key

Football League One

FA Cup

Football League Cup

Football League Trophy

Preseason and friendlies

Honours and awards

FA Cup Manager of the Season
Nigel Clough

PFA League One Team of the Season
Harry Maguire

Football League Manager of the Month
February: Nigel Clough

Football League Team of the Week
10–16 February: Nigel Clough (manager)
17–23 February: Harry Maguire
24 February – 2 March: Neill Collins

League Managers Association performance of the week
16 February 2014: FA Cup fifth round v. Nottingham Forest

The Ronnie Radford Award - FA Cup Giant-killers
Sheffield United - 3rd Round vs Aston Villa (4 January 2014)

Club end-of-season awards
Player of the year: Harry Maguire
Young player of the year: Connor Dimaio
Goal of the Season: Ryan Flynn (vs. Aston Villa)
Community player of the year: Michael Doyle

References

External links
 Sheffield United F.C. Official Website

Sheffield United F.C. seasons
Sheffield United